Andrew Thomas Hutchison Burt (23 May 1945 – 16 November 2018) was a British actor, voiceover artist, and counsellor.

Early life and education
Andrew Burt was born on 23 May 1945 in Wakefield, West Riding of Yorkshire, England, to Hutchison Burt, a psychiatrist, lecturer and Medical Superintendent at Stanley Royd Hospital, Wakefield, and Aileen, a teacher. Burt's father died when he was eight years old, also leaving an older brother, Ian. Burt was educated at Silcoates School in Wakefield. From 1963 to 1965 he performed with Oldbury Rep. He attended Rose Bruford College of Speech and Drama until 1968, and left with a bachelor's degree in English, validated by the University of Kent.

Filmography

Selected Film and TV
 Emmerdale Farm (1972–73, 1976) – Jack Sugden
 Warship (1973-6) – Lieutenant Peek
 The Black Panther (1977) – Ronald Whittle
 The Voyage of Charles Darwin (1978) – Robert Fitzroy
 The Legend of King Arthur (1979) – King Arthur
 Blake's 7 (1980) – Ven Jarvik
 Closing Ranks (1980) – David Maitland
 Gulliver in Lilliput (1981) – Gulliver
 Doctor Who – Terminus (1983) – Valguard
 Miss Marple episode "4.50 from Paddington" (1987) – Dr John Quimper
 Campion (TV series) (1989) – Inspector Oates
 Agatha Christie's Poirot episode The Affair at the Victory Ball (1991) – James Ackerley

TV series
Burt appeared in many TV series and soaps, including; Angels (TV series), Bergerac, The Bill, Callan (TV series), Casualty, Crown Court,  Dixon of Dock Green, EastEnders, Heartbeat, Howards' Way, Juliet Bravo, New Tricks, Rock Follies of '77, Rumpole of the Bailey, Spooks, and Tales of the Unexpected.

Comedy work
 I'm Alan Partridge,(1997–2002) – Announcer of Radio Norwich
 I'm Alan Partridge (2002) – Frank Raphael
 Harry Enfield's Television Programme (1992) – The Judge
 Look Around You  (Sport) (2005) – Provastian/Ninastian
 The Day Today (1994) – Martin Craste

Children's TV
 Stepping Stones (1978–1980) – Co-Presenter
 Swallows and Amazons Forever! (1983) – Frank Farland
 Jackanory (1983) The Lightkeepers – Narrator
 Jackanory (1983) The Dangerous Journey – Narrator
 Super Gran (1985) – Desperate Desmond

Radio Plays
Burt was the first actor to play the character of Inspector Morse, starring in Last Bus to Woodstock, in June 1985, on BBC Radio 4. 

He appeared regularly in numerous BBC radio plays, including Saturday Night Theatre, The Monday Play, The Afternoon Play, Afternoon Theatre, The Classic Serial, and A Book at Bedtime.

Voice-overs and narration
Burt was a voice-over artist, and provided voice-overs for numerous TV and radio commercials, documentaries and talking books, spanning five decades.

He narrated books for the blind as a volunteer for the Calibre Audio Library.

For over a decade, Burt was the announcer for ITN's ITV News programmes, including News at Ten.

Counselling career
In later years, Burt trained in counselling at the Metanoia Institute in Ealing, after which, as an accredited member of the BACP, he worked as a humanistic counsellor at his own practice, ABC Andrew Burt Counselling.

Personal life
Burt had a passion for art and a personal interest in collecting paintings and sculpture. His specific passion was the work of English artist Michael Ayrton.

He was a patron of Oldbury Rep, the theatre company where he began his acting career.

Burt had a continued friendship with Sheila Mercier, his on-screen mother in Emmerdale Farm, which lasted until his death.

Death
Andrew Burt died of lung cancer on 16 November 2018, aged 73.

References

External links
 
Andrew Burt BFI Filmography
Andrew Burt at the BBC Genome website
Hutchison Burt obituary in the British Medical Journal, 9 January 1954

1945 births
2018 deaths
20th-century English male actors
21st-century English male actors
Alumni of the University of Kent
British people of Scottish descent
British male soap opera actors
Deaths from cancer in England
English male television actors
English male film actors
English male Shakespearean actors
English male stage actors
Male actors from Yorkshire
Actors from Wakefield
People educated at Silcoates School